Ali Quli Istajlu, also known by his later, given name of Sher Afgan Khan was a Turkoman who initially served the Safavids, and later became a Mughal courtier, becoming the jagirdar of Burdwan in West Bengal (1605–1607). He was also the first husband of Nur Jahan (Mehrunissa), who later married Jahangir after Ali Quli Khan's death and became Empress of India.

He was given the title Sher Afgan Khan ("tiger grappler"), by Prince Salim, Jahangir, after his meritorious actions, during a war with the Rana of Mewar. Ali Quli Khan Istajlu, was educated under the instructions of Shah Ismail II of Safavid dynasty in Iran. Like his wife, Sher Afgan was also  an immigrant from Persia, who fled from Iran, to Kandahar, then in India.

He was the father of a daughter called Mihr-un-nissa Begum, after she married Prince Shahryar, the fifth and youngest son of Jahangir and rival to Shah Jahan.

Biography

Life
Ali Quli Khan Istajlu was a member of the Turkoman Ustajlu tribe, and was the safarchi (table-attendant) of Ismail II, the third Safavid king (shah) of Persia (1576–78). After the Shah's death, Ali Quli came to Kandahar, and at Multan he met Abdul Rahim Khan-i-Khanan who made him a royal employee while in the field.

Later, on Khan-i-Khanan's recommendation, Ali Quli received a mansab, Thatta (in present-day Pakistan). During the following years he rendered distinguished services to Akbar, and moved to the royal courts at Lahore.

Soon after his arrival at the royal courts in 1594, Ain-e-Akbari suggests, Akbar ordered his marriage to the seventeen-year-old Mehrunissa (the future Empress Nur Jahan), daughter of Mirza Ghias Beg. Ghias’s wife had access to the royal harem, and on her visits there she was often accompanied by Mehrunissa. There Prince Salim reportedly saw her and fell in love with her, and to avoid scandal, Akbar quickly married her to Ali Quli. Some historians suggest that when Prince Salim saw her, she was already engaged to be married to Ali Quli, and thus the prince couldn't marry her on that account.

When Prince Salim revolted against Akbar, Ali Quli sided with Akbar against the prince, but when Salim finally ascended to the Mughal throne in 1605 and took the name Jahangir, he pardoned Ali Quli along with all those who favoured Akbar instead of him. Ali Quli was made a jagirdar and received the region of Bardhaman in West Bengal as his domain.

Death

Shaikh Khubu, Qutbuddin Khan Koka, (Khan-i-Chishti), was the foster-brother of Jahangir, as his mother was a daughter of Shaikh Salim. When Jahangir ascended the throne of Mughal Empire in 1605, Qutbuddin was made the subedar (Governor) of Bengal, by replacing Raja Man Singh. Meanwhile, Sher Afgan Ali Quli Istajlu was tahvildar of Bardhaman, also in the province of Bengal. Numerous Mansabs and titles were bestowed on his son Sheikh Farid who eventually became the Governor of Budaun. His descendants still live in a fort (now in ruins) in Sheikhupur, Budaun.

In 1607, Qutbuddin Khan Koka was instructed to send Sher Afgan Khan to the court as he was accused of negligence and siding with Afghan rebels and transferred. Sher Afgan Khan refused to obey. Seeing this, Qutbuddin started off for Bardhaman, while he sent Ghiasa, the son of his sister, in advance to pacify Sher Afgan and bring him to the court. So upon his arrival on 30 May 1607, Sher Afgan duly went to meet him, accompanied by two men. At that moment Qutb signalled his men to arrest Sher Afgan, who stepped forward in alarm and attacked Qutbuddin sensing treachery. Qutbuddin was fatally wounded, and seeing this, his men surrounded Sher Afgan and killed him instantly.

Qutbuddin, who was fatally wounded, died later in the night. This caused much grief to Jahangir as he mentions in his memoirs, Tuzk-e-Jahangiri, where he also mentions his elation at the death of Ali Quli and hopes that "the blackfaced wretch will forever remain in hell".

The claim that Ali Quli was killed because the emperor coveted his wife has been discounted by many later historians, who cite the fact that if Jahangir had had any such intentions, he wouldn't have bestowed upon Ali Quli the title Sher Afgan, or pardoned him after he ascended the throne, or given him Bardhaman.

Another historical writer, Khafi Khan, mentions another tale about Ali Quli's death, which is said to have been related by Nur Jahan's mother. According to her, Sher Aghan did not die immediately when he was attacked by Qutbuddin's men, but wounded as he was, he managed to get to the door of his house with the intention of killing his wife, whom he did not wish to fall into the emperor's hands. But her mother would not let him enter, and told him to mind his wounds, especially as Mehrunissa had committed suicide by throwing herself into a well. "Having heard the sad news, Sher Afgan went to the heavenly mansions." Historians do not credit this tale, however.

His tomb is situated within the shrine complex of the poet Bahram Saqqa, in the present day city of Bardhaman in West Bengal, next to the tomb of Qutbuddin.

Nur Jahan's remarriage

After Ali Quli's death, his wife Mehrunissa, was sent to the royal harem, where she spent next four years as lady-in-waiting to Ruqaiya Sultan Begum. As the story progresses, in March 1611, during the New Year Day Nauroz celebrations, Prince Salim happened to see Mehrunissa at Meena Bazar Agra and immediately proposed her for marriage but actually their connection was even before the marriage of Nurjahan and Ali Quli.
Mehrunissa and Prince Salim were married two months later, on 25 May 1611, which made her Jahangir's twentieth wife as Nur Mahal, 'Light of the castle', and in 1616, she was given the title Nur Jahan, 'the Light of the World'.

Ali Quli's daughter, Mihr-un-nissa Begum, was married to Prince Shahryar, Jahangir's fifth son in 1620. Shahryar went on to briefly occupy the Mughal throne at Lahore, under the manoeuvring of Nur Jahan, after the death of Jahangir on 27 October 1627. He was later captured by Mughal forces led by Asaf Khan, and − first blinded by the orders of Prince Dawar − was later executed by Asaf Khan, at the order of Shah Jahan, who finally ascended the Mughal throne after executing all his remaining brothers.
After Qutubuddin Koka's and Sher Afgan Khan's death, the next subedar of Bengal was Jahāngīr Qulī Beg or Jahāngīr Qulī Khān (1607–1608) and when he died, Islam Khan (June 1608–died August 1613) was made the subhadar of bengal.

References

Sources

External links
 Nur Jahan
 History

Mughal nobility
1607 deaths
Year of birth unknown
Ethnic Turkmen people